The  New York Giants season was the franchise's 33rd season in the National Football League.

Regular season

Schedule

Standings

See also 
 List of New York Giants seasons

References 

New York Giants seasons
New York Giants
New York Giants season
1950s in the Bronx